Toñito or Tonito is a Spanish given name and nickname derived from Antonio. It is loosely equivalent to Little Tony in English. Notable people with this nickname include the following:

 Antonio Jesús García González, known as Toñito (born 1977), Spanish retired footballer
 Antonio Silva Delgado, known as Toñito Silva, Puerto Rican politician
 Javier Antonio Colón, known as Toñito Colón (born 1969), Puerto Rican basketball player
 Tonito Willett (born 1983), West Indian cricketer 
 Tonito Rivera, common nickname for José Antonio Rivera (1963 – 2005), Puerto Rican boxer, who was also known as El Gallo Rivera

See also

Tonino (disambiguation)
Tonio (name)
Tonita (name)
Tonite (disambiguation)
Tonto (disambiguation)